"Andy" is a song by the French duo Rita Mitsouko. It was released in summer 1986 as the lead single (with "Un jour, un chien" on the B-side) from their second studio album The No Comprendo (that would appear in September).

Writing and composition 
The song was written by Fred Chichin and Catherine Ringer.

Track listings 
7" single "Andy / Un soir, un chien" Virgin 108 284 (1986, Europe)
A. "Andy" (4:15)
B. "Un soir, un chien" (4:35)

12" maxi single Virgin 80253 (1986, France)
A. "Andy" (5:15)
B1. "Un soir, un chien" (5:45)
B2. "Bad Days" (4:55)

12" maxi single Virgin 608 701 (1986, Europe)
A. "Andy (Extended English Version)" (5:15)
B. "Andy (French Version)" (5:15)

12" maxi single Virgin SA 3109 (1987, France)
A. "Andy (Jesse Johnson Remix)" (7:35)
B. "Un soir, un chien (12" Version)" (5:36)

Remixes
 Album version – 5:15
 7" version/French Version – 4:15
 Video Version – 5:55
 English version – 4:15
 Extended English Version – 5:15
 English Version – 5:55 (from The No Comprendo CD)

Remixed by Jesse Johnson and Keith Cohen
 Jesse Johnson Remix 7" Version – 3:21
 Jesse Johnson Remix 12" Version – 7:35
 Bassapella – 6:02
 Dub – 6:00
 Instrumental – 5:58 
 Shoo Version – 6:05

Remixed by Fred Chichin (Fat Freddy) (1990)
 Andy Live – 6:53 (from Re)

Remixed by Folamour (2019)
 Folamour's Italo Remix – 5:38

Charts

"Andy (Remix)"

References

External links 
 "Andy" (single) at Discogs

1986 songs
1986 singles
Les Rita Mitsouko songs
Virgin Records singles
Song recordings produced by Tony Visconti